No deal or No Deal may refer to:

 No-deal Brexit, Brexit negotiations and scenario of no deal being reached
 Operation Yellowhammer, UK planning and actions in the event of hard Brexit occurring with no agreed deal
 "No deal", a choice available to players in various adaptations of the television game show Deal or No Deal
 "No Deal", a song written by Townes Van Zandt and recorded on the 1983 Guy Clark album Better Days

See also
 Deal (disambiguation)
 No Deals, Mr. Bond, a 1987 novel in the James Bond franchise by John Gardner